The 2019 Women's Tour of Scotland was the inaugural and only edition of the Women's Tour of Scotland, a women's cycling stage race held in Scotland, UK. It was run from 9 to 11 August 2019. It was classified as a class 2.1 event by the Union Cycliste Internationale (UCI).

The race was won by American rider Leah Thomas, riding for the  team. Having finished fourth in the second stage in Perth – won by Canada's Alison Jackson – Thomas won the final stage in an eight-rider sprint at Holyrood Park in Edinburgh, and with bonus seconds accumulated at intermediate sprints during the day, Thomas assumed the leader's jersey from Jackson by five seconds. The podium was completed by Norwegian rider Stine Borgli, riding for a Norwegian national team, a further two seconds back, after two third-place stage finishes.

The  team won the other three jerseys that were on offer during the race. Thomas was the winner of the points classification alongside her general classification victory, while the team's leader Cecilie Uttrup Ludwig led the mountains classification from start-to-finish, and Nikola Nosková was the winner of the young rider classification, after a ninth-place finish on the final stage allowed her to take the jersey from 's Emma White. The best Scottish rider during the race was Scottish junior national road race champion Anna Shackley, who finished in thirteenth place overall.

History
The first and only edition was held in 2019 as a 2.1 category race on the UCI women's road cycling calendar. The event folded when the organizers, Zeus Sports, ceased trading having failed to pay debts following the 2019 event.

Jerseys

Teams
Sixteen teams participated in the race.

Route

Stages

Stage 1
9 August 2019 — Dundee to Dunfermline, 

The opening stage of the race was abandoned after , due to adverse weather conditions. Prior to the abandonment, two intermediate sprints and one categorised climb were held and these points counted towards the respective classifications. The red sprinters' jersey went to 's Eugenia Bujak on countback from 's Marjolein van't Geloof, while  rider Cecilie Uttrup Ludwig was first on the ascent at the Grange of Lindores to take the blue and white polka-dot jersey for the mountains classification.

Stage 2
10 August 2019 — Glasgow to Perth,

Stage 3
11 August 2019 — Edinburgh to Edinburgh,

Classification leadership table

Notes

References

External links

Cycling in Scotland
Women's Tour of Scotland
2019 in women's road cycling
2019 in British women's sport